Tory Act of 1776 was penned as seven resolutions passed by the Second Continental Congress in Philadelphia, Pennsylvania on January 2, 1776. The legislative resolutions emphasized the American Patriots opposing sentiments towards the colonial political factions, better known as British America's Tories or Royalists.

Tory Resolutions of 1776
Before and during the American Revolution, the Colonial Tories sustained eminent admiration for the British Crown, Parliament of Great Britain, and unwavering loyalism for Great Britain's King George III.

January 2, 1776: Tory Resolution by the Second Continental Congress

March 14, 1776: Tory Resolution by the Second Continental Congress

June 18, 1776: Tory Resolution by the Second Continental Congress

See also

American Revolution and Espionage Activities

References

Reading Bibliography

External links
 
  
 
 
 
 
 
 
 

1770s in the Thirteen Colonies
1776 in American law
1776 in Pennsylvania
1776 in the United States
Continental Congress